A superzoom or ultrazoom lens is a type of photographic zoom lens with unconventionally large focal length factors, typically ranging from wide angle to extreme long lens focal lengths in one lens. There is no clear definition of a superzoom lens, but the name generally covers lenses that have a range well above the 3× or 4× (e.g., 28-85 mm or 70-210 mm) of a standard zoom lens, with lenses being 10×, 12×, 18×, or above considered superzoom.

Due to trade-offs in the optical design, superzoom lenses are noted for having poorer optical quality at the extreme focal length ranges, mostly distortion at max wide angle and long lens ranges. The long focal lengths normally have to be combined with image stabilization.

See also 
 List of superzoom compact cameras

References 

Photographic lenses